Angus Cameron (24 June 1929 – 1 April 1991) was a Scottish international rugby union player who played for Glasgow HSFP and Glasgow District.

Rugby Union career

Amateur career

He played for Glasgow HSFP.

Provincial career

He was selected for Glasgow District and played in the Scottish Inter-District Championship.

He played for the Scotland Possibles side in 1947.

International career

He was capped for  seventeen times between 1948 and 1956.

He also took part in the 1955 British Lions tour to South Africa. He was named as vice-captain. He played in 2 tests against South Africa - and played in another 7 matches against provincial sides; resulting in a total of 9 appearances on the tour kicking 44 points.

Family

His brother Donald was also capped for Scotland. Father to Elspeth and Angus. Grandfather to Cameron, Lorna and Angus.

References

1929 births
1991 deaths
Rugby union players from Glasgow
Scottish rugby union players
Scotland international rugby union players
Glasgow HSFP players
Glasgow District (rugby union) players
British & Irish Lions rugby union players from Scotland
Scotland Possibles players
Rugby union fly-halves